is a district located in Saitama Prefecture, Japan.

As of 2003, the district has an estimated population of 130,305 and a population density of 629.34 persons per km2. The total area is 207.05 km2.

Towns
Yorii

Mergers
On October 1, 2005, the towns of Ōsato and Menuma merged into the city of Kumagaya.
On January 1, 2006, the towns of Hanazono, Kawamoto and Okabe merged into the city of Fukaya.
On February 13, 2007, the town of Kōnan merged into the city of Kumagaya.

Districts in Saitama Prefecture